Lino Cerati (born 13 July 1938) is an Italian sports shooter. He competed in the men's 50 metre running target event at the 1976 Summer Olympics.

References

1938 births
Living people
Italian male sport shooters
Olympic shooters of Italy
Shooters at the 1976 Summer Olympics
Sportspeople from Mogadishu